Denzil Lacey is an Irish composer, employed by SiriusXM. Radio stations he has worked at since 2006 include 98FM, East Coast FM, Dublin's Country Mix 106.8, Dublin City FM, RTÉ 2fm and most recently, FM104.

Early life
Lacey was born in Dublin, Ireland and grew up in Bray, County Wicklow, Ireland. He attended primary school in Glounthaune, Cork and secondary school in Presentation College, Bray.

Biography
Lacey began his radio career on Dublin Special Interest Radio Station, Dublin City FM at the age of 14 and then later moved on to East Coast FM in County Wicklow.

His Late Night Sessions Show ran on RTÉ 2FM for three years where he presented the Jamaican music show Black Echoes.

Lacey worked across Classic Hits 4FM and Sunshine 106.8 as an imaging producer for the stations owned by Bay Broadcasting Ltd. He left Classic Hits 4FM in 2015 for a new position with Spin South West in a similar role.

He has also worked for 98FM and East Coast FM and was assistant station manager for Jam FM at Scouting Ireland's 2008 Jamboree.

In October 2016, Lacey opened the World Imaging Conference, The Imaging Days in Amsterdam.

Lacey joined RTÉ 2fm in July 2016. After a short seven-month stint, it was announced he would move to FM104 as production director.

As of 2018, Lacey produced the Radio Imaging Elements for Diplo's Revolution on SiriusXM, based out of New York.

His composition work has aired on various television series, including: Witches of Salem, Lindenstraße and Tatort.

He is also a voiceover for Spotify in Ireland.

References

External links
 Denzil Lacey Website
 Denzil Lacey on imdb
 Denzil Lacey Twitter

Living people
1990 births
Musicians from Dublin (city)
Irish radio presenters
People from Bray, County Wicklow
Mass media people from Dublin (city)